Women's 25 metre pistol (then known as sport pistol) was one of the thirteen shooting events at the 1988 Summer Olympics. It was the second installment of the event, the first to feature final shooting, and the last with the old rapid-fire target. Nino Salukvadze won the competition. Tomoko Hasegawa and Jasna Šekarić finished on the same score, four points behind Salukvadze, and Hasegawa won the silver medal due to higher score in the two-series final.

Qualification round

OR Olympic record – Q Qualified for final

Final

OR Olympic record

References

Sources

Shooting at the 1988 Summer Olympics
Olymp
Shoo